Insys may refer to:

 INSYS, a British weapons manufacturer
 Insys Therapeutics, an American pharmaceutical company